Archosaurus (meaning "ruling lizard") is an extinct genus of carnivorous proterosuchid archosauriform reptile. Its fossils are dated to the latest Permian of Russia and Poland, it is one of the earliest known archosauriforms. The type and only species is Archosaurus rossicus, known from several fragmentary specimens which cumulatively represent parts of the skull and cervical vertebrae.

When first described in 1960, Archosaurus was considered the oldest known archosaur and a close relative of Proterosuchus from the Early Triassic. However, Archosauria in modern terms is considered a more restricted group which Archosaurus lies outside of. The "classic" definition of archosaur utilized prior to the widespread use of cladistics is now roughly equivalent to the clade Archosauriformes. Archosaurus is still considered the oldest undisputed archosauriform, as well as one of the few valid members of the family Proterosuchidae.

Gallery

See also
Proterosuchus

References

Fossils of Poland
Permian Russia
Permian reptiles of Europe
Prehistoric archosauriforms
Fossil taxa described in 1960
Prehistoric reptile genera